KRLI (103.9 FM) is a radio station broadcasting a Classic Country format. Licensed to Malta Bend, Missouri, United States, the station is currently owned by Miles Carter, through licensee Carter Media LLC.

During the 2000s, the station carried a Middle of the Road/Oldies format. In June 2012, the station changed from Adult Standards to Contemporary Hit Radio and branded itself "103.9 The Grenade". On June 16, 2013, KRLI changed their format from Contemporary Hit Radio to Classic country.

References

External links

krlicountry.com

Radio stations in the Kansas City metropolitan area
Country radio stations in the United States